Bernd Bransch (24 September 1944 – 11 June 2022) was a footballer from East Germany who played as a sweeper.

Career
Bransch began his sporting career as a youngster at BSG Motor Halle-Süd. The son of a locksmith was then allowed to join sports club SC Chemie Halle in 1954. Bransch played throughout his career for SC Chemie Halle and its successor, Hallescher FC Chemie  – except for the 1973/74 season, in which he played for FC Carl Zeiss Jena.

In 1968 and 1974 he was honoured as East German Footballer of the Year.

Bransch participated in the Munich Olympics 1972, in which his East German team secured a bronze medal, and in the gold-medal winning Montreal Olympics 1976 side. He also played in the 1974 FIFA World Cup.

In total Bransch played 317 league games, scoring 43 goals.

References

External links
 

1944 births
2022 deaths
Sportspeople from Halle (Saale)
People from the Province of Saxony
German footballers
East German footballers
Footballers from Saxony-Anhalt
Association football sweepers
East Germany international footballers
Olympic medalists in football
Medalists at the 1976 Summer Olympics
Medalists at the 1972 Summer Olympics
Footballers at the 1972 Summer Olympics
Footballers at the 1976 Summer Olympics
Olympic footballers of East Germany
Olympic gold medalists for East Germany
Olympic bronze medalists for East Germany
1974 FIFA World Cup players
DDR-Oberliga players
FC Carl Zeiss Jena players
Hallescher FC players
Recipients of the Patriotic Order of Merit in silver
People from Bezirk Halle